First Baptist Church is a historic Baptist church in Richmond, Virginia, United States. Established in 1780, the church is currently located on the corner of Monument Avenue and Arthur Ashe Boulevard. The current senior minister is the Rev. Dr. Jim Somerville, former pastor of the First Baptist Church of Washington, D.C. Its historic building at 12th and East Broad streets is the home of Virginia Commonwealth University's Hunton Student Center.

History
The church moved from its original location in 1841 to E Broad St. at 12th St. Their new building was designed by architect Thomas U. Walter. It is a stuccoed temple-form Greek Revival style building with the two fluted Doric order columns of its portico in antis. During the American Civil War the church building served as an emergency hospital for Confederate Army soldiers. In 1938, the congregation sold the church to the Medical College of Virginia. Also in 1841, a group of members formed the First African Baptist Church. The original First Baptist Church had a mixed congregation.  In 1841 they separated. The First African Baptist Church occupied and purchased the original church building at E Broad St. and 14th St. (now College St.) . This building was torn down in 1876 and replaced with the one that stands in that location today.

Basil Manly Jr. was the pastor from 1850 to 1854.

Style and Worship
First Baptist Church offers two traditional Sunday services, the one at 11:00 am being broadcast live on WRIC-TV. Most aspects of the church reflect traditional Baptist churches, including Sunday school prior to worship and evening bible studies throughout the week. The music during worship is  several hymns, an offertory song (usually instrumental) and a choral anthem. Other music that may be added is children or youth choir, English handbells or various soloists on instruments.  Wednesdays offer a meal and activities for everyone.

The Youth Group takes up the whole third floor and is 8th to 12th graders. There are usually a minimum fifty people during Sunday services.

Firsts
Not only was it the first church of any denomination to be organized in Richmond, the first Baptist church organized in a Virginia city, and the first church in Virginia to organize a missionary society for women, but it also was the first in the city to organize a Sunday school for children, the first in America to send her own members as foreign missionaries to the continent of Africa, and the first in the Southern Baptist Convention to have a church library.

Modern use 
The Medical College of Virginia acquired the building in 1938, and it became the institution's first student center. In 1989, the building, then part of Virginia Commonwealth University, was named Hunton Hall for Eppa Hunton Jr. and Eppa Hunton IV. It was renovated from 2005 to 2007.

References

Further reading

External links 
 

Greek Revival church buildings in Virginia
Churches completed in 1839
19th-century Baptist churches in the United States
Baptist churches in Virginia
18th-century Baptist churches in the United States
Churches on the National Register of Historic Places in Virginia
Churches in Richmond, Virginia
Religious organizations established in 1780
National Register of Historic Places in Richmond, Virginia
Southern Baptist Convention churches